Woldemar Alexander Valerian von Boeckmann (tr. ; 12 June 1848 – 26 November 1923) was an Imperial Russian division and corps commander. He was on the State Council (Russian Empire) from 1909 to 1917.

Awards
Order of Saint Anna, 3rd class, 1874
Order of Saint Stanislaus (House of Romanov), 2nd class, 1878
Order of Saint Anna, 2nd class, 1885
Order of Saint Vladimir, 4th class, 1889
Order of Saint Vladimir, 3rd class, 1895
Order of Saint Stanislaus (House of Romanov), 1st class, 1898
Order of Saint Anna, 1st class, 1902
Order of Saint Vladimir, 2nd class, 1907
Order of the White Eagle (Russian Empire) (8 August 1916)

Sources
 Institut für Ost- und Südosteuropaforschung (Institute for East and Southeast European Studies)

References

External links
 Данные на сайте Биография. Ру
 Великие люди России — Бекман Владимир Александрович
 

1848 births
1923 deaths
Recipients of the Order of St. Anna, 3rd class
Recipients of the Order of Saint Stanislaus (Russian), 2nd class
Recipients of the Order of St. Anna, 2nd class
Recipients of the Order of St. Vladimir, 4th class
Recipients of the Order of St. Vladimir, 3rd class
Recipients of the Order of Saint Stanislaus (Russian), 1st class
Recipients of the Order of St. Anna, 1st class
Recipients of the Order of St. Vladimir, 2nd class
Recipients of the Order of the White Eagle (Russia)